Maria Dulce Rodrigues dos Santos (20 January 1901 – 8 January 1972) was a Brazilian nun and the founder of the Little Missionary Sisters of Mary Immaculate. She assumed the name of Maria Teresa of the Eucharistic Jesus after she had become a nun.

Pope Francis recognized her life of heroic virtue and proclaimed her to be Venerable on 3 April 2014.

Life
Maria Dulce Rodrigues dos Santos was born in 1901 in Brazil. She decided to consecrate herself to God and became a nun. She assumed the name of "Maria Teresa of the Eucharistic Jesus" after admittance.

She established the Little Missionary Sisters of Mary Immaculate with a focus on the Blessed Virgin Mary while catering to the needs of those who were underprivileged, ailing and poor.

She died in 1972.

Beatification process
The beatification process was introduced in Brazil with the declaration of "nihil obstat" (nothing against) and it bestowed upon her the title of Servant of God; the cause opened in 1997. The process opened on a local level and it spanned from 17 August 1997 to 25 November 2001; the process was ratified in 2003.

Pope Francis recognized her life of heroic virtue and conferred on her the title of Venerable on 3 April 2014. A miracle attributed to her was investigated and the process of that investigation was ratified on 8 February 2013.

References

External links
Hagiography Circle
Saints SQPN

1901 births
1972 deaths
20th-century venerated Christians
Founders of Catholic religious communities
Venerated Catholics by Pope Francis
People from São Paulo